Hualien Stadium, as known as Te-hsing Stadium, is a multi-use sport venue located in Hualien City, Hualien County, Taiwan.

Notable events
 38th Golden Horse Awards

See also
 List of stadiums in Taiwan
 Sports in Taiwan

References

Sports venues in Taiwan
Football venues in Taiwan
Buildings and structures in Hualien County